The Druds was a short-lived 1963 avant-garde noise music band founded by Andy Warhol, that featured prominent members of the New York proto-conceptual art and minimal art community. The band's noise rock sound has been compared to that of Henry Flynt and/or The Primitives, the band that featured the first collaboration of Lou Reed and John Cale, who would soon form The Velvet Underground.

Band members
Minimalist sculptor Walter De Maria played drums, painter Larry Poons played guitar, and minimal composer La Monte Young played the saxophone (but finding it ridiculous, quit after the second rehearsal); artist and poet Patty Mucha (then Patty Oldenburg, as she was married to sculptor Claes Oldenburg) was the lead singer. Jasper Johns wrote neodada lyrics as did Warhol who also occasionally sang. Warhol wrote the songs The Alphabet Song, Movie Stars, Hollywood and Coca-Cola. Happening artist Gloria Graves and Lucas Samaras also sang with the group.

References

American art rock groups
American experimental rock groups
Protopunk groups
Musical groups from New York City
Performance art in New York City